Apiotoma tibiaformis is a species of sea snail, a marine gastropod mollusk in the family Cochlespiridae.

Description

Distribution
This species is found in the Pacific Ocean off the Philippines.

References

External links

tibiaformis